Bichl is a municipality in the district of Bad Tölz-Wolfratshausen in Bavaria, Germany. The village first appears in documents from 1048.

The name "Bichl" refers to hill upon which the village church, St. George, stands. The church was built by Johann Michael Fischer. The origin of the name Bichl comes from the Bavarian word for hill "Bühel" which appears in many place names, where Austro-Bavarian dialects are spoken. For example: Kitzbühel.

Transport
The municipality has a railway station, on the Kochelsee Railway.

References

Bad Tölz-Wolfratshausen